Business Perspectives and Research is an academic business and management journal that is published twice a year by SAGE Publications in association with the K. J. Somaiya Institute of Management Studies and Research in Mumbai.

External links
 
 Homepage

References
 https://www.somaiya.edu/simsr

SAGE Publishing academic journals
Biannual journals
Business and management journals
Publications established in 2015